Zverinets is a rural locality (a village) in Sizemskoye Rural Settlement, Sheksninsky District, Vologda Oblast, Russia. The population was 11 as of 2002.

Geography 
Zverinets is located 63 km north of Sheksna (the district's administrative centre) by road. Malyino is the nearest rural locality.

References 

Rural localities in Sheksninsky District